Joanne Carson may refer to:
Joanne Carson, ex-wife of Johnny Carson
JoAnne Carson, artist and painter